The Capri Hollywood International Film Festival is an annual international film festival held every late December or early January in Capri, Italy. Established in 1995, the competition section is open to international films, animation, documentaries and fiction.

The Hollywood Reporter referred to it as "the last major film festival of the year" and "a key stopping point on the road to the Academy Awards." The festival is dedicated to "establishing a bridge between the film communities of Italy and Hollywood."

History
The festival was launched in 1995 by Italian journalist Pascal Vicedomini, in association with Capri In The World Institute, a non-profit organisation founded by Vicedomini. Since then, the festival holds an annual award ceremony honouring best in both International and Italian industry. The festival is organised under the patronage of Parliamentary Assembly of the Mediterranean . It is also supported by the Italian Ministry of Cultural Heritage, Activities and Tourism.

The festival takes place in Capri, Italy. During the COVID-19 pandemic, venue for the festival was expanded beyond Capri. Notable board members include Bille August, Paul Haggis, Tony Renis, Dante Ferretti, Gianni Quaranta and many more. Previous notable honourees were Sophia Loren, Frank Langella, Francesco De Gregori, Brenda Blethyn.

Rules
Feature, medium and short films can compete in the festival, where the works are selected by a board, which also selects the winners. Entries are divided into two sections: International and Italian.

International: Feature, medium and short films have to be "Original" and cannot participate in any other local festivals. A feature film has to be over 60 minutes, medium films between 20 and 59 minutes, and short films less than 20 minutes.
Italian: Italian films require the same time span and regulations as the internationals.
Films selected for the festival are screened at various locations.

Award categories

 Best Picture
 Best Director
 Best Actor
 Best Actress
 Best Supporting Actor
 Best Supporting Actress
 Best Adapted Screenplay
 Best Original Screenplay
 Best Animated Movie
 Best Documentary Feature
 Best Foreign Language Film
 Best Cinematography
 Best Film Editing
 Best Make-up and Hairstyling
 Best Production Design
 Best Original Song
 Best Original Score
 Best Sound Editing / Best Sound Mixing
 Best Visual Effects
 Best Ensemble Cast
 Career Achievement Award
At the end of the festival, the directors of the winning films in feature, medium, and short films category are honoured separately.

Winners

References

External links

Official site

Film festivals in Italy
Annual events in Italy
1995 establishments in Italy
Film festivals established in 1995
Winter events in Italy